Saathi may refer to:
 Saathi (1968 film), an Indian Hindi-language romantic drama film
 Saathi: The Companion, a 2005 Indian film
 Sathi (2002 film), a 2002 Indian Bengali-language film
 Saathi (TV series), an Indian Bengali-language television series

See also
 Saathi (disambiguation)
 Sathi (1938 film), a 1938 Indian film